Robert Wheatley (by 1517 – 1558 or later), of Cumbria and London, was an English politician.

Family
He married, but his wife's name  is unrecorded. They had two daughters, one of whom was called Anne.

Education
Wheatley was possibly educated in law at Middle Temple.

Career
He was a Member (MP) of the Parliament of England for Appleby in 1545 and 1547, for Carlisle in April 1554 and November 1554, and for Morpeth in 1558.

References

1558 deaths
People from Westmorland
Members of the Middle Temple
Year of birth uncertain
English MPs 1545–1547
English MPs 1547–1552
English MPs 1554
English MPs 1554–1555
English MPs 1558
Members of the Parliament of England (pre-1707) for Morpeth
Members of the Parliament of England (pre-1707) for Appleby
Members of the Parliament of England (pre-1707) for Carlisle
People from Cumberland